is Kotoko's eighth maxi single produced by I've Sound and released on May 23, 2007, under Geneon Entertainment. The title track was used as the first opening theme for the anime series Hayate no Gotoku, episodes 1-26. The single peaked at #7 in the Oricon charts selling 19,921 units in its first week of release.

Track listing 
ハヤテのごとく！ / Hayate no Gotoku! -- 4:26
Composition: Kazuya Takase
Arrangement: Kazuya Takase
Lyrics: Kotoko
泣きたかったんだ / Nakitakattanda—6:50
Composition: Kotoko
Arrangement: C.G mix
Lyrics: Kotoko
ハヤテのごとく！ (Instrumental) / Hayate no Gotoku! (Instrumental) -- 4:26
泣きたかったんだ (Instrumental) / Nakitakattanda (Instrumental) -- 6:48

Charts and sales

References

2007 singles
2007 songs
Kotoko (singer) songs
Hayate the Combat Butler songs
Song recordings produced by I've Sound
Songs with lyrics by Kotoko (musician)